Nanchong White Tower Park is a comprehensive park, and it is the provincial key cultural relic’s protection units. The White tower was commonly known as "the white tower" in the song dynasty, formerly known as "the boundless pagoda". It was built in the Northern Song dynasty (AD 960), and has lasted more than one thousand years.

Location
The White Tower Park, located in Nanchong, Gaoping, is connected to the city center on the other side of the river by an impressive large bridge. Jialing River, one of the most important tributaries of the Yangtze River, flows under the bridge – here the river is very wide, very quiet and very deep.

Decoration
The White Tower is 39.56 meters tall, with thirteen layer imitation wood of square tower. And it has very high value of art and history, for many people went to study  the exquisite workmanship and sculptures in the woods since the ancient times. White Tower Park is brick tower with stone as the stylobate, and it carves the pictures of dragons around the patterns. The body of the towers is 13 floors. We can enter it by the arch in the first floor.

Architect
The tower was built by Luban, an inventor in ancient China and regarded as the Father by the civil craftsmen. At that time, he had made a bet with his disciple – a white and a black tower were built by each one, the one who completed the tower firstly is the winner. At last, the white tower, built by Luban, was the firstly finished and remains extant.

Extension
From 2009, the White Tower has extended the area to twice in the square, and the road infrastructure construction in the park has been basically completed. These buildings are completed at the end of December and it can be open to the public before the Spring Festival.
The white tower has been firstly finished in 2011, which covers an area of 210 acres of park. After 2014, The white tower park has completed the second expansion, which increasingly covers an area of  500 acres  and it has become the biggest leisure park in Nanchong.

References

Parks in Sichuan
Nanchong